The 2010–11 Belmont Bruins men's basketball team represented Belmont University during the 2010–11 NCAA Division I men's basketball season. The Bruins, led by 25th year head coach Rick Byrd, played their home games at the Curb Event Center and are members of the Atlantic Sun Conference. They finished the season 30–5, 19–1 in A-Sun play to win the regular season conference championship. They also were champions of the 2011 Atlantic Sun men's basketball tournament to earn an automatic bid in the 2011 NCAA Division I men's basketball tournament where they were defeated in the first round by Wisconsin.

Roster

Schedule

|-
!colspan=9| Exhibition

|-
!colspan=9| Regular season

|-
!colspan=9| Atlantic Sun tournament

|-
!colspan=9| NCAA tournament

References

Belmont
Belmont Bruins men's basketball seasons
Belmont